An ocelot is a species of South and Central American feline, Leopardus pardalis.

The term ocelot can also refer to:
Ocelot (vehicle), a military armoured vehicle
HMS Ocelot, Royal Navy submarine.
USS Ocelot (IX-110), flagship of ServRon 10 in 1944.
Revolver Ocelot, a character in the Metal Gear Solid video game franchise.
Ocelot (musician), a musician
Ocelot (Phish), a single on the 2009 album Joy
Michel Ocelot, a French filmmaker
Ubuntu 11.10 (Oneiric Ocelot)
Ocelot Auto, a small Czech auto manufacturer.
The Ocelot (character), crime-fighter, created by Ron Wilbur, published by Eros Comix.

See also 
Ocelotl